Matjaž Smodiš (born December 13, 1979) is a Slovenian former professional basketball player. Standing at a height of 2.05 m (6'8 ") tall, he played at the power forward and center positions. During his pro club playing career, he played in seven EuroLeague Finals (2001, 2002, 2004, 2006, 2007, 2008, 2009), and he was a three-time EuroLeague champion (2001, 2006, 2008). He was also an All-EuroLeague Second Team selection in 2007. Smodiš was also the team captain of the senior Slovenian national team. He is currently a sporting director of KK Žoltasti Troti.

Professional career
During his pro career, Smodiš played with teams like Krka Novo Mesto of the Slovenian League and the Italian League clubs Virtus Bologna and Climamio Bologna. Smodiš also played with the Russian League club CSKA Moscow, from 2005 to 2011, being one of the team's major stars. In 2011, he left CSKA Moscow, and signed with the Croatian club Cedevita Zagreb (A1 Croatian League).

On November 30, 2012, he signed with his home town team, Krka. Smodiš announced his retirement from playing professional basketball in May 2013, after leading Krka to their 4th consecutive Slovenian national domestic league championship.

National team career
Smodiš was a member of the Slovenian Under-20 junior national team that won the silver medal at the 1998 FIBA Europe Under-20 Championship. Smodiš also played with the senior Slovenian national team. With Slovenia's senior national team, he played at the 1999 EuroBasket, the 2001 EuroBasket, the 2007 EuroBasket, the 2009 EuroBasket, and the 2011 EuroBasket.

Awards and accomplishments

Pro career
 2× Slovenian League All Star: (1999, 2000)
 2× Slovenian League Champion: (2000, 2013)
 2× Italian Cup Winner: (2001, 2002)
 2× Italian League Champion: (2001, 2005)
 3× EuroLeague Champion: (2001, 2006, 2008)
 2× Triple Crown Winner: (2001, 2006)
 4× EuroLeague runner-up: (2002, 2004, 2007, 2009)
 Italian League All-Star: (2004)
 3× Russian Cup Winner: (2006, 2007, 2010)
 6× Russian Championship Champion: (2006, 2007, 2008, 2009, 2010, 2011)
 All-EuroLeague Second Team: (2007)
 2× VTB United League Champion: (2008, 2010)
 Croatian Cup Winner: (2012)
 Croatian Cup MVP: (2012)
 Slovenian League Finals MVP: (2013)

Slovenian junior national team
1998 FIBA Europe Under-20 Championship:

References

External links

 Official website 
 Matjaž Smodiš at archive.fiba.com
 Matjaž Smodiš at draftexpress.com
 Matjaž Smodiš at eurobasket.com
 Matjaž Smodiš at euroleague.net
 Matjaž Smodiš at legabasket.it 

1979 births
Living people
Centers (basketball)
Fortitudo Pallacanestro Bologna players
KK Cedevita players
KK Krka players
PBC CSKA Moscow players
People from Trbovlje
Power forwards (basketball)
Slovenian expatriate basketball people in Italy
Slovenian men's basketball players
Virtus Bologna players